The Visitor is a 1979 science fiction horror film directed by Giulio Paradisi (credited as Michael J. Paradise) and based on a story by Egyptian-born Italian writer and producer Ovidio G. Assonitis. It features a cast of well-established stars including John Huston, Shelley Winters, Mel Ferrer, Glenn Ford and Sam Peckinpah with supporting appearances by Neal Boortz and Steve Somers. It was filmed on location in Atlanta, Georgia and at Cinecittà Studios in Rome. It has garnered a cult following over the years.

Plot
In an enigmatic, alien landscape, Jerzy Colsowicz experiences a vision of a powerful and destructive storm brought about by a young human girl. His colleague, an enigmatic Christ-like figure, tells his bald pupils about the centuries-long cosmic conflict between Zatteen, an evil inter-spatial force of immense magnitude with powerful psychic abilities, and his benevolent arch-rival Yahweh. Zatteen escaped to the planet Earth centuries ago, and though he was eventually tracked down and killed by Yahweh, his spirit lives on in the minds of mankind, waiting for an opportunity to reemerge and wreak havoc. The figure tells his disciples that Zatteen had produced dozens of children with human women before his death, and these descendants continue to populate the Earth.

During a professional basketball game at The Omni in Atlanta, home team owner Raymond Armstead sits courtside and promises an interviewer that the team will win at all costs. Since Raymond is a new owner and the source of his wealth is unknown, the interviewer presses him on the source of his wealth. He eventually answers that the money comes "from God". Raymond is in league with a secret group of Satanists who wish to bring about the resurgence of Zatteen. His associate Dr. Walker reminds him that his girlfriend Barbara Collins can be used as a conduit to distill Zatteen's powers into a corporeal, human form. Her 8-year old daughter Katy has already displayed psychokinetic abilities, and it's the Satanists' goal to have Raymond father a male child with Barbara, who in turn will mate with his half-sister and produce the physical embodiment of Zatteen.

Katy is only partially aware of her powers, and she experiments with them throughout the film, most notably helping Raymond's basketball team to victory. Colsowicz, who possesses powers similar to Katy, is sent to Earth by the Christ-like figure with several of his disciples, where at first they survey her from a distance. He's also acquainted with Barbara's new maid, Jane Phillips, who instantly sees the potential evil inherent in Katy, as she had once had a child with the same abilities. Katy begins using her powers to facilitate the Satanists' goals, causing a series of fatal accidents to happen to their enemies. Barbara is inadvertently paralyzed by a gunshot wound, and becomes relegated to a wheelchair. A police detective, Jake Durham, investigating the deaths is killed in a car accident facilitated by the Satanists.

Raymond fails to seduce Barbara, and the Satanists decide to proceed with other, more violent methods. Barbara does get pregnant after the intervention, but is still afraid of having another child and has her ex, Katy's biological father, Dr. Sam Collins, abort the baby. When she returns home, she is attacked for her actions by Raymond and Katy, who attempt to execute her by tying a wire around her neck and sending her down the stairs in her chair lift. Before they can succeed, Colsowicz intervenes and summons an army of birds that thwart Katy and kill Raymond. The next day, the other Satanists are found dead at their round table, presumably by Colsowicz's intervention.

Colsowicz returns to the Christ-like figure and his apostles. He reveals that he has brought Katy with him. She is now bald and cleansed of her malice, and the film ends with her smiling and embracing Colsowicz, who insists that children are not to be harmed.

Cast
                                                                                 
 Mel Ferrer as Dr. Walker
 Glenn Ford as Det. Jake Durham
 Lance Henriksen as Raymond Armstead
 John Huston as Jerzy Colsowicz
 Joanne Nail as Barbara Collins 
 Sam Peckinpah as Dr. Sam Collins
 Shelley Winters as Jane Phillips
 and introducing Paige Conner as Katy Collins

Atlanta radio personality Neal Boortz has a small role as a businessman, while fellow radio host Steve Somers has minor walk-on role. Actor Franco Nero has an un-credited supporting role as an unnamed Christ analogue.

Release

Reissue
The Visitor was released on DVD by independent distributor Code Red in November 2010. It was the first time the film had been presented in its uncut form in the United States.

In 2013, independent distributor Drafthouse Films acquired the film. Drafthouse Films announced they would re-release the film in remastered form on October 31, 2013 with a VOD/digital and home entertainment release in January 2014.

The film's soundtrack was released in 1978 in Italy and 1979 worldwide.

Critical reception
On review aggregator Rotten Tomatoes, The Visitor holds an approval rating of 78%, based on 18 reviews, and an average rating of 6.4/10. On Metacritic, the film has a weighted average score of 65 out of 100, based on 5 critics, indicating "generally positive reviews".

Film.com'''s David Ehrlich referred to the film as "a remake of The Bad Seed as filtered through the acid-tinged mind of Alejandro Jodorowsky." Many of the set pieces in the film bear striking resemblances to contemporary releases. When the Visitor returns to his cosmic home, there is an extended light sequence that is modeled on the end of Close Encounters of the Third Kind.Trunick, Alan (2013). "The Visitor", Under the Radar Katy's ominous powers are rendered in the style of The Omen, and the conflict over her nature, with good winning out over evil due to the help of an elderly man, led critic Sean Axmaker to call the film an "Exorcist knock-off". The review cited other obvious influences on the film like Carrie, The Birds, and The Lady from Shanghai.

Miscellany
The film was released in Italy under the title Stridulum and in Spain as El visitante del más allá.

On 25 October 2019, film-mocking website RiffTrax released a downloadable digital version of The Visitor with a comedic commentary of the film. They said, "The Visitors got ambitious cinematography, big name actors, and a score that makes Goblin'' sound like they barfed on their Casio. But when you add them all together, the result is a baffling mess, as incoherent as it is unintentionally funny."

References

External links
  (Drafthouse Films)
 
 
 
 

1979 films
1979 horror films
1979 independent films
1970s American films
1970s English-language films
1970s Italian films
1970s science fiction horror films
1970s supernatural horror films
Alien invasions in films
American independent films
American science fiction horror films
American supernatural horror films
Demons in film
English-language Italian films
Films about Satanism
Films directed by Giulio Paradisi
Films scored by Franco Micalizzi
Films set in Atlanta
Films shot in Atlanta
Films shot in Rome
Italian independent films
Italian science fiction horror films
Italian supernatural horror films